Francis Forcer may refer to:

Francis Forcer the Elder (c. 1650–c. 1705), English composer
Francis Forcer the Younger  (c. 1675–1743), master of Sadler's Well